Michael Liam Farnan (born January 29, 1941) is a former politician in Ontario, Canada. He was a New Democratic Party member of the Legislative Assembly of Ontario from 1987 to 1995, and was a cabinet minister in the government of Bob Rae.

Background
Farnan was educated at University College in Dublin, the National University of Dublin, the University of London in England and McGill University in Montreal, Quebec, Canada. He has a Master's degree in Education, and a bachelor's degree of arts. He has worked as a primary and secondary school teacher in London, Montreal, Cambridge, Ontario and Brampton Ontario for twenty-seven years. A devout Roman Catholic working within Ontario's separate school system, he served as provincial director of the Ontario English Catholic Teacher's Association for a time, as well as participating in a variety of community outreach projects in Cambridge. After he retired from teaching in 2002, he studied to become a real estate agent and broker of his own company Mike Farnan Realty in Cambridge. He also served as associate broker for Crown Realty Royal Le Page and for Peak Realty, both located in Cambridge.

Politics
Farnan ran for the federal New Democratic Party in Cambridge during the 1980 federal election. He came second, 3,080 votes behind Progressive Conservative Chris Speyer.  He also served on the Cambridge city council for the period in the 1980s.

Farnan was elected to the Ontario legislature in the 1987 provincial election, defeating Liberal candidate Claudette Millar in the provincial riding of Cambridge (incumbent Progressive Conservative Bill Barlow finished third).  The NDP were the official opposition in this period, and Farnan served as his party's critic for Correctional Services and Tourism and Recreation.

The NDP won a majority government in the 1990 provincial election, and Farnan was re-elected by a landslide in Cambridge. On October 1, 1990, he was appointed as the Rae government's first Solicitor General and Minister of Correctional Services.

As Solicitor-General, Farnan introduced employment equity provisions for Ontario's police force. He also established a "common pause day" which continued the province's previous restrictions on Sunday shopping.  In the spring of 1991, he became involved in a minor controversy concerning two letters which had been sent from his staff to Justices of the Peace in Ontario, one of which requested the review of a case. This was seen by some as inappropriate interference from his office, and while Farnan did not write the letters himself, he was nonetheless dropped from cabinet on July 31, 1991.  In September 1991 he was appointed as Deputy Chairman of the house and he served in that role for the next two years.

On June 17, 1993, Farnan was re-appointed as a Minister without portfolio responsible for Education and Training. In this capacity, he served as an assistant to Minister of Education Dave Cooke.

Farnan returned to a full cabinet position on October 21, 1994, having been appointed Minister of Transportation.

In 1994, Farnan was one of twelve NDP members to vote against Bill 167, a bill extending financial benefits to same-sex partners. Premier Bob Rae allowed a free vote on the bill which allowed members of his party to vote with their conscience.

The NDP were defeated in the 1995 provincial election, and Farnan lost the Cambridge seat to Progressive Conservative Gerry Martiniuk by about 5,500 votes.  He ran a second time for the House of Commons of Canada in the 1997 federal election, but finished third against Liberal Janko Peric.

Cabinet positions

After politics
In the late 1990s, Farnan became a school teacher at St. Thomas Aquinas Secondary School in Brampton, Ontario. He specialized in social science courses (mainly Religion). He retired in December 1996.

In 2021 mike renounced his membership to the NDP and joined the Green Party. 
As of December 2021 Mike is currently the campaign manager for Green Party of Ontario candidate Carla Johnson in the riding of Cambridge Ontario.

Electoral record

Provincial

Federal

References

External links

1941 births
Alumni of the University of London
Alumni of University College Dublin
Canadian Roman Catholics
Living people
McGill University alumni
Members of the Executive Council of Ontario
Ontario New Democratic Party MPPs